Emperor Gong of Sui (隋恭帝) (605 – 14 September 619), personal name Yang You (楊侑), was an emperor of the Chinese Sui dynasty. He was installed as a puppet emperor by Li Yuan, and after Emperor Yang of Sui died, Li then became the founding emperor of the Tang dynasty and had Yang You executed.

Traditionally, he was considered the last emperor of the Sui dynasty because he was succeeded and executed by Li Yuan (Emperor Gaozu of Tang), the founding emperor of the Tang dynasty. However, after him, his brother Yang Tong claimed the throne and continued to do so until 619.

Li had rebelled against the rule of Yang You's grandfather Emperor Yang of Sui in 617 and captured the capital Chang'an later that year, seizing Yang You and installing Yang as a puppet emperor. However, only the commanderies under Li's control recognized Yang You as emperor. The rest of the commanderies continued to recognize Emperor Yang of Sui as emperor.  In 618, after news arrived that Emperor Yang had been killed by the general Yuwen Huaji, Li had the young emperor yield the throne to him. Li then murdered and executed Yang You a year later.

During Emperor Yang's reign 

Yang You was born in 605, as a son of Yang Zhao, the son and crown prince of Emperor Yang.  His mother was Yang Zhao's wife, Crown Princess Wei.  He was probably the youngest of Yang Zhao's three sons—he was clearly younger than Yang Tan, born in 603, and probably younger than Yang Tong, whose birth year is unknown, based the order in which they were eventually created imperial princes.  However, under Confucian principles of succession, he would have been considered Yang Zhao's proper heir, as his mother was Yang Zhao's wife, while Yang Tan's and Yang Tong's mothers were concubines.

Yang Zhao died in 606.  However, Emperor Yang did not make Yang You or either of his brothers crown prince to replace Yang Zhao, leaving matters ambiguous as to whether one of them, or Yang Zhao's younger brother Yang Jian the Prince of Qi, would inherit the throne eventually.  He made the three sons of Yang Zhao imperial princes, and Yang You received the title of Prince of Dai. As Emperor Yang did not often stay in the capital Chang'an, starting 613, he made the eight-year-old Yang You nominally in charge of Chang'an, although he left the official Wei Wensheng in actual charge of the city.  Later that year, when the general Yang Xuangan rebelled and attacked the eastern capital Luoyang, it was Wei who led troops from Chang'an to aid Luoyang's defenses.

In 617, the general Li Yuan, fearful of Emperor Yang because Emperor Yang had become displeased with him over his inability to defend against Tujue attacks and suspicious of him after there had been prophecies that the next emperor would be named Li, rebelled at his headquarters at Taiyuan (太原, in modern Taiyuan, Shanxi).  Li, wanting to both distance himself from Emperor Yang while declaring to the Sui forces that he was still loyal to Sui, claimed that his goal was to support Yang You as emperor and to persuade Yang Guang to return from Jiangdu (江都, in modern Yangzhou, Jiangsu) as Taishang Huang (retired emperor).  Li proceeded quickly to Chang'an, and during Li's campaign, Wei died.  Wei's lieutenants Yin Shishi and Gu Yi were left in charge of the city and guardianship over Yang You.

In winter 617, Li's forces breached Chang'an's defenses.  Li took Yang You and declared him emperor (as Emperor Gong), remotely offering Emperor Yang the title of Taishang Huang, but only territory under Li's control recognized Yang You as emperor.

Reign 

While Emperor Gong was emperor, the real power was in Li Yuan's hands, and Li had Yang You make him the Prince of Tang.  Quickly, the surrounding commanderies, including most of modern Shaanxi, Sichuan, and Chongqing, submitted to Li.

With Luoyang under attack by the rebel leader Li Mi, in spring 618, Li sent troops commanded by his sons Li Jiancheng and Li Shimin there, claiming to be aiding the defense.  The Sui forces at Luoyang refused to recognize Li's authority and made no contact with Li Jiancheng's and Li Shimin's forces, which withdrew after brief engagement with Li Mi's forces.

In summer 618, just six months after Yang took imperial title, Li had Yang pass the throne to him, establishing Tang dynasty as its Emperor Gaozu.

After reign 
The new emperor created the former emperor the Duke of Xi.  The duke died in fall 619, and while traditional histories did not directly state so, they implied that he was killed on the Tang emperor's orders.  He had no sons, and his title was inherited by a distant nephew, Yang Xingji.

Notes 

|-

Sui dynasty emperors
Tang dynasty people
Monarchs deposed as children
Child monarchs from Asia
605 births
619 deaths
7th-century Chinese monarchs
Political office-holders in Shanxi
Murdered Chinese emperors
Transition from Sui to Tang
Monarchs who died as children